FRHS may refer to:
 Far Rockaway High School, in New York City, now closed
 Fellow of the Royal Historical Society
 Fellow of the Royal Horticultural Society
 Fossil Ridge High School (Fort Collins, Colorado), United States
 Fossil Ridge High School (Fort Worth, Texas), United States
 Fremont Ross High School (Fremont, Ohio), United States

See also 
 FRH (disambiguation)